The Museum of Gold is a museum located in Bogotá, Colombia. It is one of the most visited touristic highlights in the country. The museum receives around 500,000 tourists per year.

The museum displays a selection of pre-Columbian gold and other metal alloys, such as Tumbaga, and contains the largest collection of gold artifacts in the world in its exhibition rooms on the second and third floors. Together with pottery, stone, shell, wood and textile objects, these items, made of a– to indigenous cultures – sacred metal, testify to the life and thought of the different societies which lived in present-day Colombia before the Spanish conquest of the Americas.

History 
In 1934, the Bank of the Republic began helping to protect the archaeological patrimony of Colombia. The object known as Poporo Quimbaya was the first one in a collection. It has been on exhibition for 70 years. The museum is today administered by Banrepcultural.

The museum houses the famous Muisca golden raft found in Pasca in 1969, that represents the ceremony of the new zipa (ruler) of Muyquytá, the basis for the El Dorado myth. The heir to the chieftaincy assumed power with a great offering to the gods. In this representation he is seen standing at the centre of a raft, surrounded by the principal chieftains, all of them adorned with gold and feathers.

After a decade of work, the museum was expanded and renovated in October 2008. With the renovation, the museum organized the permanent exhibition in five rooms with archaeological objects and an interactive room. It also added an auditorium, some temporary exhibitions rooms, a cafe, a restaurant, and a souvenir store.

Description 
The museum has a collection of 55,000 pieces, 6,000 of which are on display in their expanded building. There are bilingual descriptions of almost all exhibits. On the first floor houses the museum's main entrance, a shop, and a restaurant.

Exhibitions begin on the second floor. The main room is called "People and Gold in pre-Hispanic Colombia". In glass vitrines display goldsmiths' work from the different cultures which inhabited Colombia before the Spanish colonists arrived. The permanent exhibition is divided into different halls for every culture: Calima, Quimbaya, Muisca, Zenú, Tierradentro, San Agustín, Tolima, Tairona, and Urabá, and a special room called "After Columbus" (Después de Colón).

The exposition continues on the third floor, with "The Flying Chamanic" and "The Offering." The first shows the process of a shamanic ceremony with its different gold pieces, the second is divided into three parts: the "Offering Room", the "Offering Boat", and the "Lake".

At the end of the exposition, there is a "Profunditation Room" with artistic videos about the most important gold pieces of the museum.

Gallery

See also 

 Calima culture
 Calima Gold Museum
 Colombian mythology
 Indigenous peoples in Colombia
 Muisca
 Muisca art
 Quimbaya civilization
 Quimbaya Museum

References

External links 
  
  
 The Art of Precolumbian Gold: The Jan Mitchell Collection, an exhibition catalog from The Metropolitan Museum of Art (fully available online as PDF), which contains material relevant to holdings at the Gold Museum
Gold Museum, Bogotá within Google Arts & Culture

Museums established in 1939
1939 establishments in Colombia
Museums in Bogotá
Art museums and galleries in Colombia
History museums in Colombia
Gold museums
Jewellery museums
Landmarks in Colombia
Archaeological museums in Colombia
National Monuments of Colombia
Pre-Columbian art